The following lists events that happened during 2001 in the Grand Duchy of Luxembourg.

Incumbents

Events

January – March
 19 February – Agreement of merger between Arbed, Usinor, and Aceralia to form Arcelor.
 23 February – Grand Duke Henri amends the grand ducal coat of arms.
 26 February – The district tribunal of Luxembourg City opens an investigation into the Clearstream Affair.
 28 March – SES Astra announces that the company will be reconstituted as SES Global (now just SES), and that the new group will buy GE Americom from GE Capital for $2.4bn of cash and $3.5bn of shares.

April – June
 3 May – Jean-Claude Juncker delivers his seventh State of the Nation address.
 15 May – André Lussi is suspended as CEO of Clearstream.
 24 May – FC Etzella Ettelbruck win the Luxembourg Cup, beating FC Wiltz 71 5–3 in the final.
 16 June – SES Astra launches its Astra 2C satellite.
 17 June – Jorgen Bo Petersen wins the 2001 Tour de Luxembourg, with Fassa Bortolo picking up the team title.

July – September
 17 July – The commune of Bettborn is renamed 'Préizerdaul'.

October – December
 2 October – La Voix du Luxembourg is launched as a separate newspaper, having previously been a French-language supplement of the Luxemburger Wort.
 1 November – Allan Simonsen replaces Paul Philipp as coach of the Luxembourg national football team.
 9 November – SES Global (now SES) is established, with SES Astra as its subsidiary.
 12 November – SES Global completes its acquisition of GE Americom.
 16 November – The section of the A7 motorway between Schoenfels and Schieren opens.
 16 November – The construction of the A13 road, between Bettembourg and Schengen, is authorised.
 29 November – Luxembourg ratifies the Kyoto Protocol, although does not deposit it until all other EU member are ready to do so.
 31 December – André Lussi is dismissed as CEO of Clearstream.

Unknown date
 Unknown – Denis Robert and Ernest Backes release the book Révélation$, describing the Clearstream Affair as the 'greatest financial scandal in the Grand Duchy of Luxembourg'.

Deaths
 24 November – Mett Clemens, cyclist

References

 
Years of the 21st century in Luxembourg
Luxembourg
2000s in Luxembourg
Luxembourg